The 1981–82 Bulgarian Cup was the 42nd season of the Bulgarian Cup (in this period the tournament was named Cup of the Soviet Army). Lokomotiv Sofia won the competition, beating Lokomotiv Plovdiv 2–1 after extra time in the final at the Slavi Aleksiev Stadium in Pleven.

First round

|-
!colspan=3 style="background-color:#D0F0C0;" |2 December 1981

|}

Second round

|-
!colspan=3 style="background-color:#D0F0C0;" |8 December 1981

|}

Third round

|-
!colspan=4 style="background-color:#D0F0C0;" |3 March 1982

|}

Quarter-finals

|-
!colspan=4 style="background-color:#D0F0C0;" |31 March 1982

|}

Semi-finals

|-
!colspan=4 style="background-color:#D0F0C0;" |2 June 1982

|}

Final

Details

References

1981-82
1981–82 domestic association football cups
Cup